Anna Christie is a 1921 play by Eugene O'Neill.

Anna Christie may also refer to the adaptations:

 Anna Christie (1923 film), adapted by Bradley King and starring Blanche Sweet
 Anna Christie (1930 English-language film), adapted by Frances Marion, starring Greta Garbo
 Anna Christie (1930 German-language film), adapted by Walter Hasenclever and Frances Marion, starring Greta Garbo

See also
Anna Christy